

Blanche Harbour-Douglas Bank Aquatic Reserve is a marine protected area in the Australian state of South Australia located in the waters of Spencer Gulf adjoining the localities of Blanche Harbor and Cultana on the east coast of Eyre Peninsula.

It was declared in 1980 to protect “the mangrove-seagrass communities and the associated fish nursery areas for fisheries management.”

Since 2012, it has been located within the boundaries of a ‘sanctuary zone’ in the Upper Spencer Gulf Marine Park.

The aquatic reserve is classified as an IUCN Category VI protected area.

See also
Protected areas of South Australia

References

External links
Entry for Blanche Harbour-Douglas Bank Aquatic Reserve on the Protected Planet website

Aquatic reserves of South Australia
Protected areas established in 1980  
1980 establishments in Australia
Spencer Gulf